International Klein Blue (IKB) is a deep blue hue first mixed by the French artist Yves Klein. IKB's visual impact comes from its heavy reliance on ultramarine, as well as Klein's often thick and textured application of paint to canvas.

History 

International Klein Blue (IKB) was developed by Yves Klein in collaboration with Edouard Adam, a Parisian art paint supplier whose shop is still in business on the Boulevard  Edgar-Quinet in Montparnasse. IKB uses a matte, synthetic resin binder which suspends the color and allows the pigment to maintain as much of its original qualities and intensity of color as possible. The synthetic resin used in the binder is a polyvinyl acetate developed and marketed at the time under the name Rhodopas M or M60A by the French pharmaceutical company Rhône-Poulenc. Adam still sells the binder under the name "Médium Adam 25".

In May 1960, Klein deposited a Soleau envelope, registering the paint formula under the name International Klein Blue (IKB) at the Institut national de la propriété industrielle (INPI), but he never patented IKB. Only valid under French law, a Soleau envelope registers the date of invention, according to the depositor, prior to any legal patent application. The copy held by the INPI was destroyed in 1965. Klein's own copy, which the INPI returned to him duly stamped, still exists.

In March 1960, Klein patented a method by which he was able to distance himself from the physical creation of his paintings by remotely directing models covered in the color.

Use in Yves Klein's art 
Although Klein had worked with blue extensively in his earlier career, it was not until 1958 that he used it as the central component of a piece (the color effectively becoming the art). Klein embarked on a series of monochromatic works using IKB as the central theme. These included performance art where Klein painted models' naked bodies and had them walk, roll and sprawl upon blank canvases as well as more conventional single-color canvases. Six sculptures by Klein in the Musiktheater im Revier, Gelsenkirchen, Germany, are executed in IKB.

In culture

Academia 
Academy Award-winning actor Eddie Redmayne, although colourblind, wrote his thesis on IKB (which he can distinguish from others) when he studied History of Art at Trinity College, Cambridge in 2003.

Film 
 In 1993, the experimental film Blue, the final piece created by Derek Jarman, used the shade IKB 79 as the sole shot for the backdrop of the entire film. Used to represent the loss of his sight, and developing a blue tinge as a result of suffering from AIDS-related complications and side effects from medical treatment.

Literature 

 In the William Gibson novel Zero History, fictional advertising mogul Hubertus Bigend wears a suit of IKB, because "it unsettles people."
 The UK-based publisher Fitzcarraldo Editions has a distinctive, minimalist, typographic treatment for all its book covers. All fiction books are Yves Klein Blue with white type, while non-fiction are the reverse, white with blue type.

Music
Yves Klein Blue, an Australian rock band, take their name from the color and the artist who created it. 
In 1982 Danish rock band Kliché released an instrumental named "International Klein Blue".
International Klein Blue is the color used by Blue Man Group.
 Roger Eno recorded a composition called Reflections on I.K.B. on his 1985 album Voices (EG Records, Virgin).
Welsh rock band Manic Street Preachers released a single on 8 December 2017 called "International Blue", which is written about Yves Klein and IKB.
'Klein International Blue' is the opening track on the Sandy Dirt EP, a collaboration between Al Larsen of Some Velvet Sidewalk, and Scottish group The Pastels, released in 1995 by the Domino Recording Company.

Television
Episode 14 of season 2 (8 May 2016) of Mike Tyson Mysteries is titled "Yves Klein Blues". The episode sees the former boxing champion seeking to use the color in his summer tracksuit.

See also
YInMn Blue
Lists of colors

References

External links
, Iona Singh, Color Facture Art and Design . Zero Books. 2012
IKB 79 (1959), Yves Klein, Tate
SFMOMA | Collections Access Online | Yves Klein | IKB74
Blue Monochrome (1961), Yves Klein, Museum of Modern Art, New York
"Everywhere, International Klein Blue" by Jude Stewart, Print, 26 October 2010
rgb.to: Color conversion for International Klein Blue

Yves Klein
Shades of blue
Pigments
Paints